William Charles Clark (12 December 1922 – 4 June 2015) was an Australian rules footballer who played with St Kilda in the Victorian Football League (VFL).

Notes

External links 

1922 births
Australian rules footballers from Victoria (Australia)
St Kilda Football Club players
People educated at Melbourne High School
2015 deaths